Buckman may refer to:

People
Albert Buckman Wharton, Jr. (a.k.a. Buster Wharton) (1909-1963), American rancher and polo player.
Anjo Buckman, German rugby union international
Bradley Buckman, American basketball player
Clarence Buckman, (1851-1917) U.S. Congressman from Minnesota
Edward Buckman, a Marvel Comics villain and leader of the New York branch of the Hellfire Club
Henry Holland Buckman (1858–1914) an attorney from Duval County, Florida
James Buckman (1814-1884), a British pharmaceutical chemist, professor, museum curator, botanist
John Buckman, American record label founder
Peter Buckman, English writer and literary agent
Phil Buckman, musician, voiceover artist and actor 
Richard Buckman, New Zealand rugby union player
Rob Buckman, Canadian doctor of medicine, comedian, author, and president of the Humanist Association of Canada
Rosina Buckman (1881–1948), a New Zealand soprano, and a professor of singing at the Royal Academy of Music
Sydney S. Buckman (1860–1929), British palaeontologist
Tara Buckman, an American television and film actress
Tom Buckman, former professional American football tight end 
Zoe Buckman, Australian runner competing

Places
United States
Buckman, Minnesota, a small city
Buckman, New Mexico, a ghost town in Santa Fe county
Buckman, Wisconsin, an unincorporated community
Buckman Township, Morrison County, Minnesota
Buckman, Portland, Oregon, a neighborhood
Buckman Arts Magnet Elementary School, Portland, Oregon
Buckman and Ulmer Building, Jacksonville, Florida
Buckman Bridge, Jacksonville, Florida
Buckman Hall (Gainesville, Florida), University of Florida campus
Buckman Lake, a lake in Minnesota
Buckman Tavern, American Revolutionary War site, Lexington, Massachusetts

Other
Buckman (company), global specialty chemical company headquartered in Memphis, Tennessee

See also
Buckman is a shortened form of the common name Buckingham